The Aichi at-large district is a constituency of the House of Councillors in the Diet of Japan that represents Aichi Prefecture. From 1947 until 2013 it has elected six Councillors, three every three years by single non-transferable vote (SNTV) for six-year terms. A 2015 revision of the Public Officers Election Law increased the district's representation to eight Councillors; the change began to take effect at the 2016 election, at which four Councillors were elected.

The Councillors currently representing Aichi are:
 Masahito Fujikawa (Liberal Democratic Party (LDP); term ends in 2022)
 Takae Ito (Democratic Party (DP); term ends in 2022) 
 Kōhei Ōtsuka (DPP; term ends in 2025)
 Yoshitaka Saitō (DP; term ends in 2022) 
 Yasuyuki Sakai (LDP; term ends in 2025)
 Ryuji Satomi (Komeito; term ends in 2022)
 Maiko Tajima (Constitutional Democratic Party of Japan (CDP); term ends in 2025)
 Noboe Yasue (Komeito; term ends in 2025)

Elected Councillors 

Party affiliations as of election day; #: resigned; †: died in office.

Previous election results

References

External links
 Aichi Prefecture Electoral Commission 

Districts of the House of Councillors (Japan)